Albert Henry Wright (1890 – 20 March 1963) was a member of the Queensland Legislative Assembly.

Biography
Wright was born in Marston, Derbyshire, the son of John Wright and his wife Elizabeth (née Barnes). He was educated at Hatton Council School, Derby, and after his arrival in Queensland was employed at the American Meatworks in Brisbane. He later worked as a coachmaker and engineer.

On 7 April 1915 he married Florence Mabel Hoskins (died 1980) in Kingaroy and together had three sons and a daughter. Wright died in March 1963 and was cremated at the Mt Thompson Crematorium.

Public career
Wright, for the Labor Party, won the seat of Bulimba at the 1923 Queensland state election, taking over the electorate from Walter Barnes, who decided to contest the new seat of Wynnum. Wright held Bulimba for six years, being defeated in 1929 by Irene Longman, the first woman in the Queensland Parliament.

After his defeat he became a representative of the Metropolitan Fire Brigade Board. Wright was also a member of the Independent Order of Rechabites.

References

Members of the Queensland Legislative Assembly
1890 births
1963 deaths
Australian Labor Party members of the Parliament of Queensland
20th-century Australian politicians
British emigrants to Australia